Vítor Hugo Gomes Passos (born 14 September 1987), known as Pelé, is a Portuguese former professional footballer who played as a central midfielder.

Club career

Early years
Pelé started playing at the youth teams of Boavista FC, then switched to S.C. Salgueiros also in his hometown of Porto. The financial crisis of the latter eventually led to the administrative descent to the Segunda Liga; subsequently, the prohibition of signing professional players led to almost every player in the squad leaving.

In the 2004–05 season, Salgueiros' senior squad was constituted primarily of 16 and 17-year-old youth players, including Pelé. Despite winning only one game and drawing other two games during the entire campaign, his performances caught attention.

Along with teammate Joel, Pelé signed for S.L. Benfica in a controversial free transfer, as the players were to move to Boavista which was willing to financially help Salgueiros. Instead, Benfica signed the players and the Paranhos club did not receive any compensation.

Vitória Guimarães
Pelé joined Benfica B for 2005–06, but did not manage to play regularly, leaving in December 2005 to sign for Vitória S.C. in Guimarães. At start of the following campaign, with the club playing in the second division for the first time in decades, he was a regular on the first team, but a poor start and a managerial change led him to the bench more often, as he finished the season with 11 league appearances and the team achieved promotion to the Primeira Liga.

Inter Milan
In August 2007, Pelé was signed by Inter Milan for €1.5 million, penning a five-year contract. He made his official debut against U.C. Sampdoria on 26 September in the Serie A, and made his first start against S.S. Lazio on 5 December, due to midfielders Olivier Dacourt, Luís Figo, Dejan Stanković and Patrick Vieira all being unavailable because of injuries.

Pelé scored his first goal for Inter on 7 May 2008, in a 2–0 away win over Lazio in the semi-finals of the Coppa Italia (also aggregate). He also found the net in the decisive match – from a brilliant long-range volley – but in a 2–1 defeat to A.S. Roma.

Porto
On the last day of the 2008 summer transfer window, Pelé was transferred to FC Porto in an exchange involving Ricardo Quaresma and €18.6 million in cash – Pelé himself was tagged at €6 million. On 26 January 2009, however, after playing almost no part in Jesualdo Ferreira's plans during the season, he was transferred to Portsmouth in the Premier League on a one-year loan deal with option to buy at the end.

On 10 June 2009, after no games for Pompey, Pelé returned to Italy, having a medical check at Genoa C.F.C. to finalise the transfer, but the deal fell through. On 20 July he was loaned out to Spain's Real Valladolid on a season-long loan, with a buyout clause to make the move permanent; he eventually finished as a starter due to injury to incumbent Álvaro Rubio, but the Castile and León side were relegated from La Liga after a three-year stay.

Later career
In July 2010, Pelé moved to Eskisehirspor in the Turkish Süper Lig, on a three-year contract. He moved teams and countries again after it expired, joining Ergotelis F.C. from Greece for two years.

On 30 December 2013, Pelé agreed to a three-and-a-half-year deal with fellow Super League Greece side Olympiacos FC. Late into the January 2015 transfer window, after only nine competitive appearances, he was loaned to Levadiakos F.C. also in the country's top flight.

Pelé was released by Olympiacos on 31 August 2015, and signed a two-year contract with Anorthosis Famagusta FC for an undisclosed fee. On 23 July 2018, after one year of inactivity, the 30-year-old joined AFC Eskilstuna in the Swedish Superettan, leaving at the end of the year with no appearances to his credit and meeting the same fate at his next club, Romania's FC Dunărea Călărași, due to a heart condition that was detected in his medical.

International career
Pelé was called up on several occasions to the Portuguese under-20 team, playing in the 2007 Toulon Tournament and in that year's FIFA World Cup. Shortly after, he began appearing for the under-21s.

Club statistics

Honours
Inter Milan
Serie A: 2007–08
Supercoppa Italiana: 2008

Porto
Primeira Liga: 2008–09
Taça de Portugal: 2008–09

Olympiacos
Super League Greece: 2013–14

References

External links

1987 births
Living people
Portuguese footballers
Footballers from Porto
Association football midfielders
Primeira Liga players
Liga Portugal 2 players
Segunda Divisão players
S.C. Salgueiros players
Vitória S.C. players
FC Porto players
Serie A players
Inter Milan players
Portsmouth F.C. players
La Liga players
Real Valladolid players
Süper Lig players
Eskişehirspor footballers
Super League Greece players
Ergotelis F.C. players
Olympiacos F.C. players
Levadiakos F.C. players
Cypriot First Division players
Anorthosis Famagusta F.C. players
AFC Eskilstuna players
Portugal youth international footballers
Portugal under-21 international footballers
Portuguese expatriate footballers
Expatriate footballers in Italy
Expatriate footballers in England
Expatriate footballers in Spain
Expatriate footballers in Turkey
Expatriate footballers in Greece
Expatriate footballers in Cyprus
Expatriate footballers in Sweden
Portuguese expatriate sportspeople in Italy
Portuguese expatriate sportspeople in England
Portuguese expatriate sportspeople in Spain
Portuguese expatriate sportspeople in Turkey
Portuguese expatriate sportspeople in Greece
Portuguese expatriate sportspeople in Cyprus
Portuguese expatriate sportspeople in Sweden